The Sovereign's Prize is a British fullbore target rifle shooting competition. It is the climax of the National Rifle Association's annual Imperial Meeting and is widely regarded as one of the most prestigious prizes in the sport globally. The prize is typically referred to as the Queen's Prize or the King's Prize depending on the incumbent British monarch, although in colloquial use "the Queen's" has predominated due to the long reigns of Queen Victoria and Elizabeth II.

The Prize was first contested in 1860, with the winner receiving a gold medal and £250. Strictly speaking, the "Queen's Prize" refers to the £250 cash prize, which was originally the personal gift of Queen Victoria. As of 2022, the Prize has been contested 153 times, breaking only for the World Wars. Although contested on an open basis, it has only been won three times by women (in 1930, 2000 and 2022). Five people have won it three times.

Course of Fire

As of 2022, the Prize is contested in three stages. Standard NRA targets are used, with scoring rings offering a maximum score of five points, plus a "v-bull" within the 5-ring (used for tie-breaking). Since the move to the National Shooting Centre at Bisley, the first and second stages have been contested on the 600yard range Century Range, whilst the final is contested on Stickledown Range (which can support shooting up to 1200yards).

Stages II and III are sometimes known as a "Queen's Prize" match. A "Queen's Prize" is used as the standard course of fire for fullbore rifle matches at the Commonwealth Games, although all competitors shoot all distances without elimination.

Queen's I 
Stage one is an open elimination round consisting of three "2+7" matches (2 sighters with 7 shots to count) at 300, 500 and 600yards. This gives a highest possible score of 105 with 21 V-bulls (rendered as 105.21v).

The top three hundred competitors progress to the second stage, which typically includes scores of ~101 or better.

Queen's II 
Stage two consists of 2+10 matches at the same distances as the first stage. Qualification is on a "start from zero" basis, meaning that scores from the first stage are not carried forward and top qualifiers have no advantage over those with poorer scores in the first stage. The highest possible score is 150 with 30 v-bulls (150.30v).

The top one hundred competitors progress to the third and final stage. The "Queen's Hundred" each receive an NRA '100' Badge. The top scorer in the second stage is awarded an NRA Silver Medal for winning the "short range" portion of the competition, regardless of how they perform in the final.

Queen's III (Queen's Final) 
Stage three moves to longer distances, consisting of 2+15 matches at 900 and 1000yards. Scores are carried forward from the second stage, giving a highest possible score of 300.60v. Winning scores better than 298 are common, indicating the shooter has only dropped one or two shots across five distances and sixty shots.

The winner receives a gold medal and £250, with the runners up receiving silver and bronze badges respectively. The winner is then "chaired" off the range on an open sedan chair borne by other competitors. By tradition they are carried to the NRA offices to receive their prize, followed by a tour of the clubhouses on camp.

Winners
Notable winners include the three female winners – Marjorie Foster (1930); JF Hossack (2000) and Alice Good (2022). A road on Bisley Camp is named Majorie Foster Way.

The Fulton family have the unique distinction of having three generations of winners. George Fulton used the proceeds of his 1888 win to found Fulton's Gun Shop on Bisley Camp, which still stands today. His son Arthur won a record-breaking three times in 1912, 1926 and 1931. Arthur Fulton's son Robin won in 1958.

Arthur Fulton's record was only matched in 1996. There are now five shooters who have won the Prize three times:

 Arthur Fulton (1912, 1926, 1931)
 Alain Marion (1980, 1983, 1996)
 TA Ringer (1992, 1997, 2001)
 David Calvert (2010, 2015, 2016)
 GCD Barnett (2002, 2003, 2019)

Also notable is PA Bennison's 1998 shoot, where he became the first person to score a "possible" with 300.40v. Canadian shooter James Paton matched this in 2005 with another 300.40v.

See also
Bisley – The Queen's Prize – a BBC film following the 1986 Imperial Meeting and Queen's Prize, presented by Brian Glover.

Notes

References

National Rifle Association (United Kingdom)
Sports trophies and awards
Rifle shooting sports
Recurring events established in 1860
British sports trophies and awards
Target shooting trophies and awards